Waisa Bhi Hota Hai Part II is a 2003 Indian Hindi-language film starring Arshad Warsi. Shashanka Ghosh, the creative driver behind the launch of MTV and Channel V in India, marks his debut as a director with this film.

Film's song Allah Ke Bande is the most famous song of this film.

Plot 

Puneet Sayal is a copywriter with a dream: to earn enough cash to dump his job and live peacefully in Nainital. Till the said dream materialises however, he's living in Bombay with his girlfriend Agni.

Things go asunder one day when he finds out his brother's been shot dead — a brother he's hardly acknowledged in the past. Agni finds out and, following an argument, throws him out of the house. Puneet goes on a drinking spree that leads him to a park bench where he witnesses someone being shot. He doesn't know it yet, but this is the end of his life as he knows it.

He saves the injured man — a gangster called Vishnu  — and the act lands him squarely in the middle of Bombay's famed gang wars.

The war between ganglords Ganpat and Gangu is a second thread in the film. Ganpat is the dominant kingpin, and Gangu is the perpetual second-in-place who's never given up her dreams of displacing Ganpat as top don.

Cast 
 Arshad Warsi as Puneet Sayal
 Prashant Narayanan as Vishnu
 Sandhya Mridul as Inspector Agni Sinha
 Anant Jog as Ganpat
 Pratima Kazmi as Gangu Tai
 Suchitra Pillai as Shalu
 Manini De as Sumi
 Skand Mishra as Chandu
 Kurush Deboo as Cyrus

Singers Kailash Kher, Shibani Kashyap and Rabbi Shergill make a cameo in the film and sing their songs on-screen. Mahima Chaudhry and Maria Goretti also make special appearances. The barista trio in the film comprises Channel V VJs Ranvir Shorey and Shruti Seth, and John Owen.

Reception 
The film received positive reviews from critics, but failed commercially. As of 2014, Shibani Kashyap has been known for being able to effortlessly sing sad romantic songs, but sadly she fails to create the magic she did with the song "Sajna aa bhi ja".

Awards 
Kailash Kher won the Best Male Playback Singer award at the 2004 Star Screen Awards. The film was nominated for Best Performance in a Negative Role (Pratima Kazmi), Best Dialogues, Best Editing, Best Lyrics and Best Screenplay at the Star Screen Awards but failed to win any.

Soundtrack 

The soundtrack features seven songs by composers including Vishal–Shekhar, Shibani Kashyap, Saibal Basu and Abhinav Dhar and written by Sadaquat Hussain, Vishal Dadlani, Abhinav Dhar and Virag. The soundtrack listing is given below.

 "Aao Aa Jao Aa Bhi Jao" (Sunidhi Chauhan) (Music: Vishal–Shekhar) – 4:48
 "Allah Ke Bande" (Kailash Kher) (Music: Vishal–Shekhar) – 4:06
 "Laundiya Ke Pallu Mein" (Rabbi Shergill) – 4:51
 "My Name Is Gurdeep" (Bali Brahmbhatt) – 3:53
 "Saajna Aa Bhi Ja" (Shibani Kashyap) – 4:26
 "Tum Bas Tum" (Shibani Kashyap) – 3:57
 "Prem Dunk" (Shibani Kashyap) – 3:40

References

External links 
 Official Site
 
 

2003 films
2000s Hindi-language films
Films scored by Shibani Kashyap
Films scored by Vishal–Shekhar
Films directed by Shashanka Ghosh